George Harder (born June 22, 1974) is a Samoan former professional rugby union footballer of the 1990s and 2000s. He usually played at wing or centre

Career

Club career
He played for Te Atatu and then, for Waitemata at club level and Auckland in New Zealand's domestic NPC tournament and for Auckland Blues in the then Super 12. Harder also had a spell with the Brisbane Broncos rugby league team.

He joined Leeds Tykes in 2002, and then Harlequins in the summer of 2003. He made his league debut in the 33-27 victory over London Wasps but suffered a knee ligament injury the following week that would keep him out of action for three months. Unfortunately his time at Quins has been disrupted by injury throughout.
On 22 2004 he won the European Challenge Cup with the team: in the quarterfinals and semifinals against CA Brive and Connacht he scored only three tries (two in the quarterfinals), playing also in the final on 22 May, 2004 against Montferrand (won 27:26). He finished his playing career at Stade Montois in Pro D2.

International career
He made his debut for the Samoa on 13 April 1995 in a test match in Johannesburg against  South Africa. Played just 4 games, including 3 games in the  1995 World Cup, and scored 15 points thanks to 3 tries. The last game was played in the quarterfinals also against South Africa on 10 June, also played in Johannesburg. Taking into account unofficial matches against clubs and provincial representative teams, he played 28 tests for Samoa.

Personal life
Harder played as wing and center and distinguished by his physical strength, which allowed him to overcome the enemy's defenses and make tries, as well as the desire to go to the tryline.

References

External links
 Harlequins profile
 George Harder at New Zealand Rugby History

1974 births
Living people
Samoan rugby union players
Samoa international rugby union players
Samoan expatriate rugby union players
Harlequin F.C. players
Leeds Tykes players
Expatriate rugby union players in England
Expatriate rugby union players in New Zealand
Expatriate rugby union players in Australia
Samoan expatriate sportspeople in Australia
Samoan expatriate sportspeople in New Zealand
Samoan expatriate sportspeople in England
Rugby union centres